Los Vaqueros 2: El Regreso is the seventh studio album  by Reggaeton duo Wisin & Yandel. Featured guests are not only signed to WY Records, but also  non-Latino artists from the hip hop genre as T-Pain, 50 Cent and Sean Kingston. The album was released on January 25, 2011, through Universal. This album is the sequel to Los Vaqueros.

Background
In conjunction with the promotion of their live album La Revolución: Live, in June 2010 the duó announced to work on the continuation of their successful 2006 album Los Vaqueros. The same month it were confirmed collaborations with Tego Calderón, Franco "El Gorila", Cosculluela and De La Ghetto on the track "La Reunión De Los Vaqueros" song that later was included on their live album, as well the release date confirmed to November 2010. Later, they announced the track "Tu Olor" as the album's first single but was changed for "Zun Zun Rompiendo Caderas". Early November 2010, they announced the album's first single will feature American rappers 50 Cent and T-Pain, as well the album's title. The album cover for the Deluxe Edition and track list was revealed on December 18, 2010.

Reception

Commercial performance 
In United States, the first week prediction were between 35-40k. However Los Vaqueros 2: El Regreso debuted at #8 with sales of 31,000 on the Billboard 200. It became Wisin & Yandel's second top ten album and highest album debut on the top ten after La Revolución debuted at #7 in 2009. It also debuted at #1 on the Billboard Top Latin Albums, and became their fifth number one album on the chart. On the Top Rap Albums the album debuted at #2, becoming on their highest debut on the chart, it also peaked at #1 on Billboard's Latin Rhythm Albums chart and was the best-selling album in Puerto Rico at the time. It was the 5th Best Selling Latin Album in the United States with 123,000 copies sold.

On the Mexican Albums Chart the album debuted at #1 under the title El Regreso de Los Vaqueros, becoming on their third number one album on the chart.

Critical response 

John Bush from Allmusic said that "It's an LP that's meant to evoke 2006's crew-laden Los Vaqueros, which firmly established reggaeton's first family with appearances by Don Omar and Franco "El Gorilla", as well as a host of newcomers. This one is similarly studded with nearly a dozen stars and up-and-coming talents—Unlike many of their contemporaries, who clearly can't contain a parade of collaborators in a seamless whole, Wisin & Yandel easily shuttle between pop, urban, and reggaeton with few speed bumps." Frances Tirado from Primerahora said that "This album is great for the fans of reggaeton, because the lyrics speak mainly of the club environment and conquer of girls, the love and heartbreak -- Music producers participating, injected the electronic dance sounds of classic reggaeton to make a solid urban music." Los Vaqueros received a nomination for a Lo Nuestro Award for Urban Album of the Year.

Singles
"Zun Zun Rompiendo Caderas" was released as the first official single on December 7, 2010. The music video was premiered in January 2011, directed by long-time collaborator Jessy Terrero. The single debuted at no. 50 on the US Latin Songs, and peaked at no. 12.
"Tu Olor" was released as the second single from the album, the song is currently charted on the US Latin Songs at number 32, and number 14 on the US Latin Pop Songs. A music video was filmed and released.

Other releases
"No Dejemos Que Se Apague" was released to digital marketplaces on December 21, 2010, the song features rappers 50 Cent and T-Pain. The music video was released in December 2010, also directed by Jessy Terrero. The song has not been released officially as single.

Track listing
The duó co-wrote every song on the album. Others who worked on the songs are given below.

Personnel 
Taken and adapted from Allmusic.com.

Juan Luis Morera (Wisin) – composer, executive producer
Llandel Veguilla (Yandel) – composer, executive producer
Edgar Andino – executive producer, management
Ernesto F. Padilla (Nesty "La Mente Maestra") – composer, producer
Víctor Martínez – composer, producer
Marcos Masis (Tainy) – composer, producer
Kisean Paul Anderson – composer, producer
GoodWill – composer, producer
MGI – composer, producer
Giann Arias – composer
Tegui Calderón – composer
John Steve Correa – composer
Luis F. Cortes – composer (Franco El Gorilla)
Kristian Ginorio – composer
Henri Lanz – composer
Raul "Alexis" Ortiz – composer

Joel "Fido" Martínez – composer
Joel Muñoz – composer
Faheem Rasheed Najm – composer
Ramon Luis Otero – composer
Will Rapaport – composer
Efraín David Fines – composer
David Torres – composer
José "El Profesor" Gómez – composer
José Fernando Cosculluela – composer
Rafael Castillo – composer
Orlando Aponte – composer
Iancarlo Reyes – creative director
Paco López – label manager
Jose "Hyde" Cotto – mixing
Edwin David – photography
Ana Alvarado – production coordination

Charts and certifications

Charts

Certifications

See also
List of number-one albums of 2011 (Mexico)
List of number-one Billboard Latin Albums from the 2010s

References

External links
 Wisin & Yandel official website

2011 compilation albums
Wisin & Yandel compilation albums
Machete Music compilation albums
Spanish-language albums